Arhopala anthelus, the anthelus bushblue, is  a species of lycaenid or blue butterfly found in the Indomalayan realm.

Subspecies
A. a. anthelus (Burma)
A. a. anthea (Evans, 1925) (Mergui, southern Burma, Thailand, Vietnam, Laos)
A. a. anunda (Hewitson, [1869]) (Borneo, Sumatra)
A. a. expallida Seki, 1994 (Sumatra)
A. a. fulgurita Seki, 1994 (Mentawai islands)
A. a. grahami Corbet, 1941 (Peninsular Malaysia, Langkawi)
A. a. impar Evans, 1957 (Mindoro)
A. a. jabadia Fruhstorfer, 1914 (western Java)
A. a. majestatis Fruhstorfer, 1914 (Nias)
A. a. marinduquensis Hayashi, Schröder & Treadaway, 1984 (Philippines: Marinduque)
A. a. mitis Seki, 1994 (Pulau Belitung)
A. a. paradisii Schröder & Treadaway, 1990 (Philippines: Dinagat)
A. a. reverie Seki, 1994 (Panay Island)
A. a. sanmariana Osada & Hashimoto, 1987 (Philippines: north-eastern Luzon)
A. a. saturatior (Staudinger, 1889) (Philippines: Palawan)
A. a. sotades Fruhstorfer, 1914 (Philippines: Mindanao)

Gallery

References

Arhopala
Butterflies described in 1851
Butterflies of Asia
Taxa named by John O. Westwood